The Technomancer is an action role-playing video game, developed by Spiders and published by Focus Home Interactive. The game is set within the same universe as Spiders' previously developed game, Mars: War Logs. Olivier Deriviere scored The Technomancer.

Plot
The game is set during the War of Water, 200 years after humans colonized Mars. The protagonist is a rookie technomancer named Zachariah from Abundance, one of the powerful corporations on the red planet, who is on the run from the secret police. Zachariah flees the city of Ophir and heads to the town of Noctis which is nearby. He then attempts to find a beacon to establish contact with Earth.

Gameplay
There are three styles of combat. The player can add companions to their party, who can then level up. The player will also be able to improve their own combat abilities, and they can make different choices about how to solve each quest. There are three different endings, and each is slightly modified by several major choices the player makes throughout the game. The player can craft their weapons and armor. There are four different skill trees.

Development
The game was first announced on April 10, 2015. Spiders wrote an open letter to PlayStation Blog accompanied by a new trailer for the game. A 13-minute gameplay video was released on August 7, 2015, and another five-minute video was released on June 21, 2015.

In an April interview, CEO Jehanne Rousseau explained that "Mars is a lot bigger in The Technomancer compared to what you saw in Mars: War Logs." There will be several hubs and cities that can be unlocked. Rousseau estimated the main quest to be around 25 to 30 hours of play and "easily extended to around 50 hours with the inclusion of side quests." Overall there are around 4 times as many quests as there were in Bound by Flame. In a second interview when asked about the possibility of DLC, Rousseau stated that the game would be a complete and finished product, and although they do not currently have plans for additional content after launch, Spiders "may consider it at a later date." According to Spiders CEO and Creative Director, Jeanne Rousseau, the game is their largest and most expansive to date.

Reception

The Technomancer received "mixed or average" reviews, according to video game review aggregator Metacritic. IGN stated the game "has all the moving parts of a mid-2000s BioWare game but lacks technical polish and storytelling finesse to a sometimes painful degree." Combat was heavily criticized for its lack of "flow or rhythm" and difficulty that depends on random chance, but they praised the setting.

References

External links
 

2016 video games
Dystopian video games
PlayStation 4 games
Science fantasy video games
Stealth video games
Action role-playing video games
Role-playing video games
Science fiction video games
Video games developed in France
Video games scored by Olivier Deriviere
Video game sequels
Video games set on Mars
Windows games
Xbox One games
PhyreEngine games
Single-player video games
Focus Entertainment games
Cyberpunk video games
Spiders (company) games